Bicyclus dorothea, the light bush brown, is a butterfly in the family Nymphalidae. It is found in Guinea-Bissau, Guinea, Sierra Leone, Liberia, Ivory Coast, Ghana, Togo, Nigeria, Cameroon, Equatorial Guinea, São Tomé and Príncipe, the Central African Republic, Angola and the Democratic Republic of the Congo. The habitat consists of disturbed areas and clearings in forests.

The larvae feed on Paspalum conjugatum, Paspalum polystachium and Axonopus compressus.

Subspecies
Bicyclus dorothea dorothea (Guinea-Bissau, Guinea, Sierra Leone, Liberia, Ivory Coast, Ghana, Togo, Nigeria, Cameroon, Equatorial Guinea, Angola, western Democratic Republic of the Congo)
Bicyclus dorothea concolor Condamin & Fox, 1964 (Equatorial Guinea: Bioko, São Tomé and Príncipe: São Tomé)

References

Elymniini
Butterflies described in 1779